Liberia competed in the Summer Olympic Games for the first time at the 1956 Summer Olympics in Melbourne, Australia.

References
Official Olympic Reports
sports-reference

Nations at the 1956 Summer Olympics
1956
1956 in Liberian sport